Patrick "Pat" Caplice (born 4 April 4 1927, Sydney) is an Australian jazz musician (drums and vibraphone).

Career 
Caplice studied harmony at the New South Wales Conservatorium of Music between 1952 - 1955, and during that time his groups The Pat Caplice Ensemble and Pat Caplice Quintet performed on the ABC's 2FC-NA radio stations. Caplice performed with The Art Ray Quintet who released their album 'Midnight Melodies' in 1952.

Caplice led several of his own groups. In 1954, The Pat Caplice Trio consisted of Jan Gold (guitar), Ken McClure (bass), and Caplice (vibraphone), and appeared on ABC radio. Caplice also worked with Jan Gold in The Pat Caplice Ensemble, alongside John Morrow (bass), Ken Hardy (bass clarinet), Peter Richardson (flute), and Don Osborne (drums). The Ensemble released their first recording 'Mood Modern' in February 1957, and in their review The Sydney Morning Herald called The Ensemble, "one of the few Australian avant garde jazz groups, is reminiscent of the brilliant Swedish modernists more than the American school."

The Pat Caplice Trio continued to perform at clubs in Sydney, and were noted for their experimentation in jazz instrumentation. In 1958, the trio expanded to include Mal Cunningham on flute and recorded as The Pat Caplice Quartet. Released by Columbia Records as  'Caprice: Adventures In Sound With Pat Caplice', the album was credited as the "first 12-inch long-playing record made by an Australian jazz band." ABC Weekly praised the album for displaying "the latest trends in jazz", and Caplice's ability to provide an atmosphere for his musicians to play their best.

Although Caplice's records were reviewed favourably and sold well at the time, his band didn't receive enough work and disbanded.

During the mid-1950s, Caplice briefly worked at Sydney's 2UW as a panel operator before returning to music. He also recorded as part of the Music Maker 1957 All-Stars, which also featured Freddy Logan, Don Burrows, and others voted Australia's best jazz musicians at the time.

Gallery

References

External links 

Australian jazz musicians
Living people
Musicians from Sydney
1927 births
Australian drummers
Vibraphonists